"That Golden Rule" is the second single to be taken from Scottish alternative rock trio Biffy Clyro's fifth studio album, Only Revolutions, released on 23 August 2009.

The band describe the song as a mixture of prog and stoner rock, citing that "[it's] like Kyuss and Tool playing with some Scottish freaks screaming over the top of it". It received its first radio play in early July 2009, on Zane Lowe's Hottest Record in the World slot on Radio 1. The single debuted at number 10 on the UK Singles Chart on 30 August 2009, as well as number one on the Scottish Singles Chart, making the song the band's fourth and most recent number-one single on that chart. The song was used by Sky Sports in its coverage of Super League from 2011 to 2013.

Music video
The video for That Golden Rule was shot in Chiswick House, West London. It was released on NME's official website on 22 July 2009. The video received heavy airplay on British rock television stations Scuzz and Kerrang! TV and has been A-listed by BBC Radio 1.

Artwork
Storm Thorgerson's artwork for the single references the band's previous studio album, Puzzle, with a missing jigsaw piece resting in front of a sailor. The other man, sailing into the distance, appears to have a jigsaw shaped hole in his side – it is likely that this represents the man depicted on the front cover of Puzzle.

Thorgerson later confirmed this on his official website, stating:

Track listing
CD single 14FLR38CD
"That Golden Rule"
"Prey Hey"

7" Picture Vinyl 14FLR38
"That Golden Rule"
"Eye Lids"

7" Orange Vinyl 14FLR38X
"That Golden Rule"
"Time Jazz"

iTunes Digital EP
"That Golden Rule"
"Prey Hey"
"Eye Lids"
"Time Jazz"

Charts

References

Biffy Clyro songs
Song recordings produced by Garth Richardson
2009 singles
2009 songs
14th Floor Records singles
Songs written by Simon Neil
Number-one singles in Scotland